The Siberian Curse: How Communist Planners Left Russia Out in the Cold is a book written by Fiona Hill and Clifford G. Gaddy, two political scientists and fellows of the Brookings Institution in 2003.

In the book they propose the thesis that Siberia, while one of the most resource-abundant regions in the world, is too big and harsh to be populated and industrialized on an economically rational basis. Consequently, since the collapse of the USSR, which planned and subsidized Siberian towns, a westward exodus to the urban European part of Russia is occurring. The large territory, they state, is not one of the greatest sources of strength of Russia, but one of its greatest weaknesses.

See also
Demography of Russia
Gulag 
Magnitogorsk 
Sino-Soviet border conflict 
Vladivostok 
Zek
Why Russia is not America

External links
Google books - 
Foreign Affairs book review - 
International Herald Tribune summary - 
A critical review of the book by The eXile - 

2003 non-fiction books
Books about Russia
Books about the Soviet Union
Siberia